Teguima or Tehuima may refer to:
 Teguima people, an ethnic group of Mexico
 Teguima language, their language

See also 
 Tagima